The MK5000C is a  North American diesel-electric locomotive developed by MK Rail. At the time of its introduction in 1994, the MK5000C was the most powerful single prime mover diesel-electric locomotive ever made, a title it would hold for only for one year until GE Transportation released its competing  AC6000CW model in 1995.

In response to the MKRail program, GE announced the 6000 hp AC drive GE AC6000CW, and EMD announced the  EMD SD80MAC, and later the  EMD SD90MAC, both which were AC drive locomotives.

Technical
The MK5000C was powered by the 5000 hp Caterpillar V12 3612 diesel engine. This diesel engine remains one of the largest engine blocks used in rail service in North America. The Cat 3612 features a  bore with a  stroke and has a  displacement per cylinder,  total. The 3612 has dual turbochargers that are liquid aftercooled. The 3612 idles at 300 rpm and has a maximum speed of 1000 rpm.

The Caterpillar 3612 drove a Kato 16P12-27000 main alternator which was capable of handling 8400 amperes at 1315 V DC at 1000 rpm. The MK5000C rode on two 3 axle Dofasco designed bolster-less trucks, the same that many Canadian MLW and GE designed locomotives ride on.

Like most modern locomotives the MK5000C was microprocessor controlled, using an in-house designed system called the MK-LOC. This system monitored the performance of all aspects of the locomotive and controlled the power output as well as the traction control/adhesion of the locomotive. The MK5000C also had electro-pneumatic braking, provided by the EPIC 3102 air brake system which can be found on locomotives of other builders.

The MK5000C carried 5300 US gallons (20,100 L) of diesel, 246 US gal (931 L) of lubricating oil, and 320 gallons (1,210 L) of coolant. This coolant system was unlike that of most other North American locomotives, using a water/antifreeze mix; only with a few Caterpillar repowered switchers and the Electro Motive Division SD90MAC share this trait.

The MK5000C generated  of continuous tractive effort, and produced around 35% adhesion on dry rail.

Appearance
The MK5000C at first look appears similar to many 1990s era EMD locomotives. The MK5000C has a fuel tank and long hood that appear very similar to EMD designs; however mechanically the MK5000C shares very little in common with any EMD product.

History
Six were built, three in August 1994 for demonstration on the Southern Pacific numbered 501 to 503, and another three in August 1995 for demonstration on the Union Pacific numbered 9901 to 9903. Due to termination of the MK Rail high horsepower program, neither railroad purchased the model, and the units were returned after one year of demonstrations. Production was stopped after the sale of MK Rail in 1996, and three more partially built units sat in storage until 2001, when their frames were scrapped by MK Rail successor Motive Power. One of the MK5000C cabs was used on Dakota, Minnesota & Eastern Railroad 5000, a former ATSF SD45B rebuilt into a SD50M-3. This unit is still in service as MPEX 5000, and can be found in lease service on various railroads in North America. The other six were leased briefly to BC Rail.

In 2001 the Utah Railway tested and later acquired all six from Wabtec, the owner of Motive Power. However, after one year of operation, all units were out of service due to problems with the main bearings on the Caterpillar 3612 diesel engine and Kato main alternator. The units were returned to Wabtec and had the Caterpillar 3612 and Kato main alternator removed and replaced with an EMD AR11 main alternator. At the same time, the engine blocks were replaced by EMD 3500 Horsepower 16-645F3B diesel engines from five retired Union Pacific EMD SD50 and one retired Union Pacific EMD GP50 locomotives. The six were reclassed with the designation MK50-3 and put back in service with the Utah Railway.

In March 2017, four units were prepared to be shipped to the Kyle Railroad, a few months after Utah Railway's coal train contracts expired. A BNSF train picked up the four units and left with them on March 14, 2017. A fifth unit, left the Utah Railway in late March/April, and the final unit departed on April 6, 2017.

References

 
 
 
 

C-C locomotives
Diesel-electric locomotives of the United States
MPI locomotives
Railway locomotives introduced in 1994
Standard gauge locomotives of the United States